Erfurt-Bischleben station is a railway station in the Bischleben district of Erfurt, Thuringia, Germany.

References

Bischleben
Buildings and structures in Erfurt
Railway stations in Germany opened in 1847